St. Albans is a civil parish in the Gedling borough of Nottinghamshire, England.

At the time of the 2011 census the population was 3,290. As well as the part of Bestwood Country Park surrounding Bestwood Lodge, a former ducal residence, the parish includes the residential areas of Warren Hill, Warren Wood, Deer Park and 'The Gardens' on the northern outskirts of the Greater Nottingham conurbation.

History 
At the time it was a part of the much larger Sherwood Forest and was a hunting ground for royalty, nobility, and the wealthy. A medieval hunting lodge used as a residence for these visits was later rebuilt as Bestwood Lodge in 1863 on instructions of the 10th Duke by architect S.S. Teulon, after the decision to base his seat there. The present-day Bestwood Emmanuel Anglican Church belonged to the Duke's family as their chapel, it was also built by Teulon in 1869. The area south and west of the lodge was converted into farmland as well as Bestwood Colliery towards the turn of the 20th century. 

Later Dukes did not reside at the lodge, and after 1900 it was leased to local entrepreneurs, one being Sir Frank Bowden who was a key investor in the Nottingham Raleigh cycle business. The northern boundary of Nottingham was extended outwards in 1933 close to the colliery and the forested edges of Bestwood Park, where it has remained since. The estate was sold in 1939, with most of the southern farmland obtained by Nottingham Corporation for housing, resulting in the Bestwood Estate, Bestwood Park, Top Valley and Rise Park suburbs built from 1940 to the late 1970s. The area north of the city boundary bar the colliery area was purchased by Arnold Urban District council for building houses, however the area around the Lodge was requisitioned by the military for use as a wartime camp and training facility, with shooting ranges, trenches and a control base for Northern Command being set up. 

By the mid 1960s housing was being built along the Bestwood Lodge Drive and Woodchurch Roads up to the city boundary for army use, before the military returned control of the area to Gedling borough council from 1973 onwards. The colliery closed in 1967 and the area was bought by Nottinghamshire County Council and landscaped, combining their ownership of the area with Gedling to form Bestwood Country Park in 1985. Big Wood School was built in 1976-80. The Nottinghamshire Fire and Rescue Service headquarters was opened on the site of old army facilities in March 1985 by the Prince and Princess of Wales. From 1974 the Nottingham city area became administratively part of the wider county, and the decision was taken by the county council to extend the building of the new suburbs past the city boundary up to the parkland area. Warren Hill and the other residential areas in St Albans were largely complete by 1990. Nottingham City Council was made administratively independent in 1998, its pre-1974 boundary being re-established forming an awkward enclave of housing around Warren Hill with road access only from the city urban area. In 2022, Nottinghamshire Fire and Rescue Service moved their headquarters out of the parish to a shared premises with Nottinghamshire Police, and the building due to be demolished to allow homes to be built.

Communities 
The residential areas are subdivided into defined areas:

Warren Hill - named for The Warren area of the Country Park, which it abuts – Muirfield Road, Bewcastle Road (from Muirfield Road up to Emmanuel Avenue), Emmanuel Avenue, Plantation Close, Tyburn Close, Jermyn Drive, Fenchurch Close, Aldwych Close, Stockdale Close, Shacklock Close, Edmonds Close, Ludgate Close, Finsbury Road, Hatton Close, Gerrard Close, Brompton Close, Lambeth Road.

Warren Wood – close to The Warren and Big Wood park areas - Cairngorm Drive, Cheviot Close, Chiltern Close, Church View Close, Emmanuel Avenue, Grampian Drive, Pennine Close, Pentland Drive, Plantation Close, Quantock Close, St. Emmanuel View.

The Gardens – Augustine Gardens, Lindisfarne Gardens, Iona Gardens, Tithe Gardens, Boniface Gardens, Wearmouth Gardens, Ruthwell Gardens, Hadrian Gardens, Jarrow Gardens, Chad Gardens, Aidan Gardens, Hexham Gardens, Benedict Court.

Deer Park - The area around Deer Park Drive and Woodchurch Drive.

Amenities 
 Best Western Bestwood Lodge Hotel
 Emmanuel Church Bestwood (Anglican)
 Oakwood Academy (previously Big Wood School)
 Warren Primary Academy
Warren Hill Community Church
Woodview Business Park (part of)

Geography 
Just 200m north east of this, Violet Hill is higher at  but is just outside the parish. Much of the western and southern area of the parish is built over with housing and extends to the inner boundary of the Nottingham green belt. The central and eastern is either forested, being part of Bestwood Country Park, or parkland/farmland.

Several rural features within the parish are named:
Gaunt's Hill
 Moyra Plantation
The Strip
Queens Bower
Churchfield Plantations
Cricket Ground
Murfield Recreation Ground

References

External links 

 Now defunct Bestwood St. Albans Parish Council website
 St. Albans Parish Council website
 Nottinghamshire.County Council - History of Bestwood

2018 establishments in England
States and territories established in 2018
Civil parishes in Nottinghamshire
Gedling
Sherwood Forest